Makedonski Železnici (MŽ; , "Macedonian Railways") is the public enterprise for railways in the Republic of North Macedonia. Railway operations are run by Železnici na Republika Severna Makedonija Transport and the infrastructure maintained by Makedonski Železnici Infrastruktura.

The Republic of North Macedonia is a member of the International Union of Railways (UIC). The UIC Country Code for the Republic of North Macedonia is 65.

Macedonian Railways operates  rail tracks in North Macedonia and maintains  of lines,  of which are electrified with the 25 kV 50 Hz AC system.

Trains
Macedonian Railways Transport operates a large number of train sets, which consist of passenger trains (diesel and electric trains) and freight trains.

A contract for the purchase of 6 new passenger train sets, manufactured by China's CRRC Corporation at the Zhuzhou Electric Locomotive Works, was signed in 2014. The first train-set arrived in August 2015. Each train consists of 3 rail cars, and is designed to carry 200 passengers. They will be used on routes from Skopje to Bitola, Gevgelija, Kičevo, Kumanovo, and Veles.  This is the first time North Macedonia has bought new passenger trains since its independence, and the first time a Chinese EMU or DMU manufacturer has entered the European market.

Overview

The first standard gauge line in the area, from Skopje to Thessaloniki was built in 1873 during Ottoman rule.

North Macedonia has a well-developed railroad system. It is connected to Kosovo via Volkovo in the northwest, to Serbia via Tabanovci in the north and to Greece via Gevgelija in the southeast and via Kremenica in the southwest. North Macedonia's main rail line between the Serbian and Greek borders, from Tabanovci to Gevgelija, is entirely electrified.

The railway company has its headquarters in the capital Skopje. The original city railway station was partially destroyed in the 1963 earthquake and now houses the Museum of the City of Skopje. The new principal railway station forms the upper level of the integrated Transportation Center Skopje.

All domestic lines are operated by Macedonian Railways, with links from Skopje to Tetovo, Gostivar and Kicevo in the west, to Volkovo in the northwest, to Kumanovo and Tabanovci in the north, to Sveti Nikole, Štip, and Kocani in the east, to Veles, Negotino and Gevgelija in the south - southeast and to Bogomila, Prilep and Bitola in the southwest.

According to a local journalists' report dated 2011, passenger service within the country is quite slow, and trains and stations are often poorly maintained. Nonetheless, the inexpensive rail service is well patronized, and on occasions trains are standing-room only.

Rolling stock

Electric Locomotives

Diesel Locomotives

Electric Multiple Units

Diesel Multiple Units

International connections and services

The main north–south line from Niš in Serbia to the port of Thessaloniki in Greece on the Aegean Sea (Corridor X), passes through Kumanovo, Skopje, Zelenikovo, Veles, Negotino, Demir Kapija, Miravci and Gevgelija.

Intercity trains link Kumanovo, Skopje, Zelenikovo, Veles, Negotino (Kavadarci), Demir Kapija, Miravci (Valandovo) and Gevgelija (Bogdanci) with Serbian Railways and Greek railways.

Connections to Bulgarian State Railways are via Niš in Serbia and via Thessaloniki in Greece.

Intercity trains from Kosovo Railways link Skopje with Pristina.

In 2010, Makedonski Železnici joined Cargo 10, a joint venture with other railways in the region.

Plans

Corridor VIII

In the planning stage 2020 is a project to construct new rail links connecting to the existing east–west line (Beljakovci, Kumanovo, Skopje, Tetovo, Gostivar and Kičevo):
 An  link in the East, from Kumanovo to the Bulgarian border, which would connect North Macedonia to Varna (Bulgaria) and to the Black Sea.
 A  link in the West, from Kičevo to the Albanian border, which would connect North Macedonia to Durrës (Albania) and to the Adriatic Sea.

Corridor X
The Ministry of Transport and Communication has begun studies for the renewal and reconstruction of several section of the corridor X:
 Renewal and reconstruction of railway track on the  section between Bitola and Kremenica as a part of the Xd branch of Corridor X
 Reconstruction of the  railway section between Kumanovo and Deljadrovci
 Reconstruction of the  railway section between Dračevo and Veles

References

External links

Macedonian Railways
Macedonian Railways - Infrastructure
More information about the Macedonian Railways
Macedonian passenger trains - photo gallery

 
Railway companies of North Macedonia
Companies of North Macedonia
Brands of North Macedonia